Robin Bhatt is a writer in Bollywood. He is the half-brother of Mahesh Bhatt and Mukesh Bhatt and son of Nanabhai Bhatt. He has written many films and was nominated thrice and won an award for Baazigar.  He is honoured with Lifetime Achievement Award at Jaipur International Film Festival-JIFF in 2019. His debut film as writer was Aashiqui, which proved to be a hit film.  He has written many films for Bhatt Productions.

Besides writing, he has also worked as an actor and an assistant. In his 20-year-long career he has written about 66 films and also acted in more than 10 Hindi Films such as Chalte Chalte, Golmaal Returns, U Me Aur Hum etc. He has worked with some of the greatest filmmakers in his career. Many of his films have gone on to become high grossers at the box office, such as Aatish, Sadak, Aashiqui and many more.  He was nominated for Omkara, Koi Mil Gaya and Krrish and won an award for Baazigar for best screenplay.

Personal life
Bhatt was born to film director Nanabhai Bhatt and Hemlata Bhatt. Bhatt's father and mother were Nagar Brahmin.

Among his half-siblings are producer Mukesh Bhatt and director Mahesh Bhatt. Actresses Alia Bhatt and Pooja Bhatt are his nieces and actors Emraan Hashmi and Mohit Suri are his nephews.

Filmography

Jaan Ki Baazi (1985)
Aashiqui (1990)
Dil Hai Ke Manta Nahin (1991)
Saathi (1991)
Sadak (1992)
Junoon (1992)
Pehchaan (1993)
Platform (1993)
Hum Hain Rahi Pyaar Ke (1993)
Gumraah (1993)
Baazigar (1993)
Dhanwaan (1994)
Tadipaar (1994)
Aatish (1995)
Milan (1995)
Gaddar (1995)
Zamaana Deewana (1995)
Hum Dono (1995)
Chaahat (1996)
Raja Hindustani (1996)
Itihaas (1996)
Betaabi (1997)
Duplicate (1998)
Major Saab (1998)
Angaaray (1998)
Daag: The Fire (1998)
Kartoos (1999)
Jaanwar (1999)
Mela (2000)
Badal (2000)
Tera Jadoo Chal Gayaa (2000)
Raju Chacha (2000)
Ek Rishtaa (2001)
Ajnabee (2001)
Aap Mujhe Achche Lagne Lage (2002)
Yeh Raaste Hain Pyaar Ke (2002)
Ab Ke Baras (2002)
Hum Kisise Kum Nahin (2002)
Talaash: The Hunt Begins... (2003)
Andaaz (2003)
Chalte Chalte (2003)
Koi Mil Gaya (2003)
Zameen (2003)
Jodi Kya Banayi Wah Wah Ramji (2004)
Aetbaar (2004)
Kismat (2004)
Woh (2004)
Elaan (2005)
Blackmail (2005)
Bachke Rehna Re Baba (2005)
Barsaat (2005)
Dosti: Friends Forever (2005)
Mere Jeevan Saathi (2006)
Krrish (2006)
Omkara (2006)
Sarhad Paar (2007)
Ek Chalis Ki Last Local (2007)
Sunday (2008)
U Me Aur Hum (2008)
Aamir (2008)
Mehbooba (2008)
Ghajini (2008)
Billu Barber (2009)
All The Best: Fun Begins (2009)
Atithi Tum Kab Jaoge? (2010)
Aakrosh (2010)
Golmaal 3 (2010)
Tezz (2012)
Krrish 3 (2013)
Teri Meri Kahaani (2013)
Grand Masti (2013)
Jazbaa (2015)
Shivaay (2016)

References

External links
 Filmography Bollywood Hungama
 

Indian male film actors
Male actors in Hindi cinema
Indian male screenwriters
Living people
Screenwriters from Gujarat
Year of birth missing (living people)